Nu Nu Nge Nge is a 1970 Burmese black-and-white drama film, directed by Tin Aung Myin Oo starring Win Nyunt, Kyaw Hein,  Kyi Kyi Htay, Sandar and Kyauk Lone.

Cast
Win Nyunt as U Kyaw Thet
Kyaw Hein as Thet Htway
Kyi Kyi Htay as Daw Htar Htar
Sandar as Nu Nu
Kyauk Lone as U Ba Thet
Thar San as Hla Maung

Award

References

1970 films
1970s Burmese-language films
Films shot in Myanmar
Burmese black-and-white films
1970 drama films